Deposition may refer to:
 Deposition (law), taking testimony outside of court
 Deposition (politics), the removal of a person of authority from political power
 Deposition (university), a widespread initiation ritual for new students practiced from the Middle Ages until the 18th century

Art
 Deposition from the Cross, the depiction of the removal of Jesus from the cross
 Deposition (Bellini), a 1515–16 painting by Giovanni Bellini and his workshop
 Deposition of Christ (Bronzino), a 1545 oil painting
 The Deposition (Michelangelo), a 1547–55 marble sculpture
 The Deposition from the Cross (Pontormo), a 1528 oil painting
 Deposition from the Cross, Volterra (Rosso Fiorentino)
 The Deposition (Raphael), a 1507 oil painting
 The Deposition (Rubens), a 1602 painting by Peter Paul Rubens (previously attributed to van Dyck) now in the Galleria Borghese
 Deposition (Rogier van der Weyden) or The Descent from the Cross, an oil painting, c.1435
 Deposition (van Dyck, 1615), a 1615 painting by Anthony van Dyck, now in the Alte Pinakothek in Munich
 Deposition (van Dyck, 1618), a 1618-20 painting, now in the Kunsthistorisches Museum in Vienna
 Deposition (van Dyck, 1619), a c.1619 painting, now in the Ashmolean Museum
 Deposition (van Dyck, 1629), a c.1629 painting, now in the Royal Museum of Fine Arts Antwerp
 Deposition (van Dyck, 1629-30) or Lamentation over the Dead Christ, lost 1945
 Deposition (van Dyck, 1634), a 1634 painting, now in the Alte Pinakothek in Munich
 Deposition (van Dyck, 1635), a 1635 painting, now in the now in the Royal Museum of Fine Arts Antwerp
 Deposition (van Dyck, 1640), a 1634-40 painting, now in the Valdes Izaguirre collection

Science
 Deposition (chemistry), molecules settling out of a solution
 Deposition (geology), material such as sediment being added to a landform
 Deposition (phase transition), the process by which a gas is transformed into a solid
 Deposition (aerosol physics), a process where aerosol particles set down onto surfaces

Technology
 Cathodic arc deposition, a physical vapor deposition technique using an electric arc to vaporize material from a cathode target
 Chemical vapor deposition, a chemical process used in the semiconductor industry to produce thin films
 Electron beam-induced deposition, a process of decomposing gaseous molecules by an electron beam
 Electrospark deposition, a micro-welding manufacturing process typically used to repair damage to mechanical components
 Electrophoretic deposition
 Ion beam-assisted deposition, a combination of ion implantation with a physical vapor deposition technique
 Molecular vapor deposition, the gas-phase reaction between surface reactive chemicals and an appropriately receptive surface
 Nanoparticle deposition, the process of attaching nanoparticles to solid surfaces called substrates to create coatings of nanoparticles
 Particle deposition, the spontaneous attachment of particles to surfaces
 Physical vapor deposition, a variety of vacuum deposition methods used to produce thin films and coatings
 Pulsed laser deposition, a physical vapor deposition technique using a high-power pulsed laser beam in a vacuum chamber

Other uses
 Defrocking or deposition, the opposite of ordination in many Christian churches
 "Depositions" (Superstore), an episode of the TV series Superstore
 "The Deposition" (The Office), an episode of the TV series The Office

See also
 Depo (disambiguation)
 Deposit (disambiguation)

ia:Deposition